The Atlanta Biltmore Hotel and Biltmore Apartments is a historic building located in Atlanta, Georgia. The complex, originally consisting of a hotel and apartments, was developed by William Candler, son of Coca-Cola executive Asa Candler, with Holland Ball Judkins and John McEntee Bowman. The original hotel building was converted to an office building in 1999. The building is currently owned by the Georgia Institute of Technology and is adjacent to Technology Square.

History

Opened on April 19, 1924, the 11-story hotel and 10-story apartment building were constructed somewhat away from downtown Atlanta, in an area that became known as Midtown.  Designed by the New York firm of Schultze and Weaver, the hotel was operated by Bowman-Biltmore Hotels.

The Atlanta Biltmore is easily distinguished by the towering radio masts on each end of the building, with vertical illuminated letters that spell out "BILTMORE". The studios on the top floor broadcast WSB-AM from 1925 until 1956.  The large radio masts supported the transmitting antenna of WSB-AM from 1925 to 1929, when output power was increased to 5,000 watts, and a suburban transmitter site was built in East Lake.

In 1967, the Atlanta Biltmore was sold to Sheraton Hotels and became the Sheraton-Biltmore Hotel. Sheraton spent $5 million on renovations and operated the hotel until 1979, when they sold it to Biltmore Hospitality Partners, which renamed the hotel the Atlanta Biltmore. Both buildings were listed on the National Register of Historic Places on January 20, 1980. The hotel closed in 1982 and was sold in 1984 to Renaissance Investment Corporation, which planned to convert both the smaller apartment tower and the enormous hotel tower to condominiums. They completed work on the apartment tower, but then went bankrupt in 1986 and had to sell the entire property. The newly renovated apartment tower was opened as the Biltmore Suites Hotel while the main building remained vacant for many years. 

The complex was sold to Novare Group in January 1998, who gutted and transformed the main hotel building into office space, reopening it in 1999. Due to extensive renovations over the years, there were only two remaining historic public rooms, the two main floor ballrooms. They were fully restored and are used as public function rooms, known as The Biltmore Ballrooms. The adjoining Biltmore Suites Hotel was closed in 1998 and converted to condominiums known as Biltmore House, which opened in 1999.

On June 13, 2016, The Biltmore was purchased from Novare by the Georgia Institute of Technology.

Photo gallery

See also 

 National Register of Historic Places listings in Fulton County, Georgia
 Hotels in Atlanta

References

External links

 The Biltmore Ballrooms - official website
 Biltmore House Condominiums - official website
 Atlanta Time Machine's Then/Now photo #1
Atlanta Time Machine's Then/Now photo #2
Atlanta Time Machine's Then/Now photo #3
Atlanta Time Machine's Then/Now photo #4
 National Park Service's National Register of Historic Places: Atlanta 
 Atlanta, Georgia, a National Park Service Discover Our Shared Heritage Travel Itinerary

1924 establishments in Georgia (U.S. state)
Apartment buildings in Atlanta
Bowman-Biltmore Hotels
Commercial buildings on the National Register of Historic Places in Georgia (U.S. state)
Hotel buildings on the National Register of Historic Places in Georgia (U.S. state)
Hotels in Atlanta
National Register of Historic Places in Atlanta
Residential buildings completed in 1924
Residential buildings on the National Register of Historic Places in Georgia (U.S. state)
Sheraton hotels